Cyclohexa-1,3-diene (also known as Benzane) is an organic compound with the formula (C2H4)(CH)4.  It is a colorless, flammable liquid. Its refractive index is 1.475 (20 °C, D). A naturally occurring derivative of cyclohexa-1,3-diene is terpinene, a component of pine oil.

Synthesis
Cyclohexadiene is prepared by the dehydrobromination of 1,2-dibromocyclohexane:
(CH2)4(CHBr)2 + 2 NaH → (CH2)2(CH)4 + 2 NaBr + 2 H2

Reactions
Useful reactions of this diene are cycloadditions, such as the Diels-Alder reaction.

Conversion of cyclohexa-1,3-diene to benzene + hydrogen is exothermic by about 25 kJ/mol  in the gas phase.
cyclohexane → cyclohexa-1,3-diene + 2 H2 (ΔH = +231.5 kJ/mol; endothermic)
cyclohexane → benzene + 3 H2 (ΔH = +205 kJ/mol; endothermic)
cyclohexa-1,3-diene → benzene + H2 (ΔH = -26.5 kJ/mol; exothermic)

Compared with its isomer cyclohexa-1,4-diene, cyclohexa-1,3-diene is about 1.6 kJ/mol more stable.

Cyclohexadiene and its derivatives form metal-alkene complexes. Illustrative is [(C6H8)Fe(CO)3], an orange liquid. This complex reacts with hydride-abstracting reagents to give the cyclohexadienyl derivative [(C6H7)Fe(CO)3]+. Cyclohexadienes react with ruthenium trichloride to give (Benzene)ruthenium dichloride dimer.

See also
 1,4-Cyclohexadiene
 Cyclohexene

References

Cyclohexadienes
Conjugated dienes